Aeropuerto is a Panama Metro station on El Ramal, the eastern terminus of a two-station extension of Line 2. It was opened on 16 March 2023 as part of the extension of Line 2 from Corredor Sur. 

The El Ramal trains terminate at Corredor Sur, there is no through traffic to Line 2. 

The station is located at Tocumen International Airport, from which its name originates. This is an elevated station.

References

Panama Metro stations
2023 establishments in Panama
Railway stations opened in 2023